The gymnastics competition at the 2018 Gymnasiade was held from May 2–9 in Marrakesh, Morocco.

Medal winners

See also 
 Gymnastics at the 2013 Gymnasiade
 Gymnastics at the 2022 Gymnasiade

References 

Gymnasiade
2018 Gymnasiade
2018 Gymnasiade